Bello is an Italian, Spanish surname from bello "handsome/beautiful" (Late Latin bellus), hence a nickname for a handsome man. In medieval Italy, the word was also applied as a personal name, which also gave rise to the surname. Bello is also a Fulani surname widely common in Nigeria. Notable people with the surname include:

Ahmadu Bello (1910-1966), former Premier of Northern Nigeria
 Alfred Bello, witness in trial of Rubin Carter
Andrés Bello (1781–1865), Venezuelan poet, lawmaker, philosopher, and educator
Antoine Bello (born 1970), French-American writer
B. J. Bello (born 1994), American football player
Babatounde Bello (born 1989), Beninese footballer
Brayan Bello (born 1999), Dominican baseball player
Carolina Bello (born 1983), Uruguayan writer
Emilio Bello (1868–1941), Chilean lawyer, diplomat and politician
Frank Bello (born 1965), American bass guitar player
 Henry Bello, shooter in Bronx Lebanon Hospital attack
Joaquín Edwards Bello (1887-1968), Chilean writer
John Bello (born 1946), American entrepreneur
José Bello (1904–2008), Spanish intellectual and writer
Louie Bello, American musician
Marco Bello ( – 1523), Italian painter
Maria Bello (born 1967), American actress
Walden Bello (born 1945), Academic and political analyst

Other 
 Doctor Bello, a 2013 Nigerian film

See also
 Di Bello

References

Italian-language surnames
Spanish-language surnames